Brouvelieures is a commune in the Vosges department in Grand Est in northeastern France.

Geography

The river Mortagne flows northwestward through the northern part of the commune.

See also
Communes of the Vosges department

References

Communes of Vosges (department)